Cielito Flores Habito (born 20 April 1953 in Cabuyao, Laguna) or "Ciel" Habito is a Filipino economist, professor, and columnist. He served concurrently as the Director-General of the National Economic and Development Authority and Socio-Economic Planning Secretary during the Ramos administration.

He is one of the 1991 Ten Outstanding Young Men Awardees for Economics.

Early life and education
Habito was born on 20 April 1953 in Cabuyao, Laguna. He studied at the Maquiling School in Los Baños for grade school, then at the Philippine Science High School for secondary education. He attended the University of the Philippines Los Baños for his tertiary education, earning a degree in Agriculture, major in Agricultural Economics and graduating Summa Cum Laude.

He then attended the University of New England in Armidale, New South Wales, Australia, where he earned a Master of Economics degree. He also obtained a Master of Arts in Economics and a Doctor of Philosophy in Economics at the Harvard University in Cambridge, Massachusetts.

Career

Academic career
Habito currently teaches Economics at the Ateneo de Manila University. He was also director of the Ateneo Center for Economic Research and Development, a research unit in economics and economic policy at the same university, before being succeeded by Dr. Leonardo Lanzona.

Columnist
He writes a weekly column entitled No Free Lunch in the Philippine Daily Inquirer's opinion section. From August 2003 to June 2010, he wrote for the same newspaper's business section. Before writing for the Inquirer, his column was formerly published at The Manila Times.

In 2012, Habito and the Inquirer published a book featuring a selection of his previous articles for the newspaper.

References

External links
 No Free Lunch, Philippine Daily Inquirer Latest Columns of Dr. Habito

1953 births
Filipino business and financial journalists
Filipino columnists
Directors-General of the National Economic and Development Authority of the Philippines
People from Cabuyao
Academic staff of Ateneo de Manila University
Harvard Graduate School of Arts and Sciences alumni
University of the Philippines Los Baños alumni
Living people
Ramos administration cabinet members
Philippine Daily Inquirer people
University of New England (Australia) alumni